Tom Treinen (born March 9, 1943) is an American sports shooter. He competed in the men's 25 metre rapid fire pistol event at the 1976 Summer Olympics.

References

1943 births
Living people
American male sport shooters
Olympic shooters of the United States
Shooters at the 1976 Summer Olympics
People from Le Mars, Iowa